These lists give the provinces of primary affiliation, and of birth for each president of the Philippines, consisting of the 17 heads of state in the history of the Philippines.

Provinces of primary affiliation
A list of presidents of the Philippines including the province with which each was primarily affiliated, due to residence, professional career, and electoral history. This is not necessarily the province in which the president was born.

Provinces of primary affiliation by president

Presidents with primary residence outside of birth province
Of the 16 individuals who have served as president of the Philippines, 4 served after officially residing in a different province than the one in which they were born.

Presidents by province of primary affiliation
Presidents with an asterisk (*) did not primarily reside in their respective province of primary affiliation (they were not born in the province listed below).

Birth places
A list of birthplaces of presidents of the Philippines.

The number of presidents born per modern-day province are:
 One: Aurora, Batangas, Bohol, Capiz, Cavite, Cebu, Ilocos Norte, Ilocos Sur, Pampanga, Pangasinan, Southern Leyte, Tarlac, and Zambales
 Four: Metro Manila

Notes and references

See also
 List of vice presidents of the Philippines by place of primary affiliation

Philippines 
Province, List of Philippine Presidents by